Edeltraud is a Germanic feminine given name derived from two Old High German elements: "aþalaz" ("adal") meaning "noble", and "þrūþiz" ("trud") meaning "strength". Edeltraud is most commonly found in German-speaking countries.

Notable people named Edeltraud
Edeltraud Brexner (1927–2021), Austrian ballet dancer 
Edeltraud Günther (born 1965), German economist
Edeltraud Hanappi-Egger (born 1964), Austrian academic
Edeltraud Koch (born 1954), German swimmer 
Edeltraud Roller (1957–2020), German political scientist
Edeltraud Schramm (1923–2002), Austrian gymnast
Edeltraud Schubert (1917–2013), German actress

References 

German feminine given names
Feminine given names